A Song in My Heart is the first studio album from Welsh tenor Wynne Evans and was released on 21 March 2011. Evans signed a six-album deal with Warner Music. The album went to number one in the UK Classical Albums Chart in its first week of release.

Track listing

Charts

References

2011 classical albums
Wynne Evans albums